Robert Were Fox may refer to:

Robert Were Fox the Elder (1754–1818), businessman
Robert Were Fox the Younger FRS (1789–1877)

See also
Robert Fox (disambiguation)